Echo and Narcissus is a myth from Ovid's Metamorphoses, a Roman mythological epic from the Augustan Age. The introduction of the myth of the mountain nymph Echo into the story of Narcissus, the beautiful youth who rejected Echo and fell in love with his own reflection, appears to have been Ovid's invention. Ovid's version influenced the presentation of the myth in later Western art and literature.

Story

The myth of the goddess is told in Book III of the Metamorphoses, and tells the story of a "talkative nymph" whom the goddess Venus admires for her magnificent voice and song. When she tricks Juno into believing that her husband, Jupiter, was in the city, Juno curses Echo by making her able to only finish a sentence not started, and unable to say anything on her own. "Yet a chatterbox, had no other use of speech than she has now, that she could repeat only the last words out of many." This is the explanation of the aural effect which was named after her.

Sometime after being cursed, Echo spied a young man, Narcissus, while he was out hunting deer with his companions. She immediately fell in love with him and, infatuated, followed quietly. The more she looked at the young man, the more she longed for him. Though she wished with all her heart to call out to Narcissus, Juno's curse prevented her.

During the hunt, Narcissus became separated from his companions and called out, ‘is anyone there,’ and heard the nymph repeat his words. Startled, Narcissus answered the voice, ‘come here,’ only to be told the same. When Narcissus saw that nobody had emerged from the glade, he concluded that the owner of the voice must be running away from him and called out again. Finally, he shouted, "This way, we must come together." Taking this to be a reciprocation of her love, Echo concurred ecstatically, "We must come together!"

In her delight, Echo rushed to Narcissus ready to throw her arms around her beloved. Narcissus, however, was appalled and, spurning her, exclaimed, ‘Hands off! May I die before you enjoy my body.’ All Echo could whisper in reply was, ‘enjoy my body’ and having done so she fled, scorned, humiliated, and shamed.

Despite the harshness of his rejection, Echo's love for Narcissus only grew. Echo's fellow nymphs prayed to Nemesis to punish Narcissus with a love that was equally not reciprocated.  Nemesis caused him to fall in love with his own reflection in a pool of water where he wasted away and died, unable to take his eyes away from the beautiful youth he did not recognise as himself. Narcissus, looking one last time into the pool uttered, "Oh marvellous boy, I loved you in vain, farewell", Echo too chorused, "Farewell."

Eventually, Echo, too, began to waste away. Though she was immortal, her body faded and her bones turned to stone, until all that remained of Echo was the sound of her voice.

Gallery

See also
 Classical mythology

References

    Technology Studies (University of Illinois)
  Mythology Guide

Metamorphoses
Characters in Roman mythology

de:Echo (Mythologie)#Echo und Narziss